The Port of Berdiansk is a seaport located in the city of Berdiansk, Ukraine. Berdiansk Seaport is the only one in the Zaporizhzhia Oblast and one of the two Azov ports of Ukraine (along with Mariupol).

According to the Law "On Seaports of Ukraine," the functions of the seaport administration are performed by the Berdiansk branch of the state enterprise of the Ukrainian Sea Ports Authority.

See also

Berdiansk port attack

References

Ports and harbours of Ukraine
Ports and harbours of the Sea of Azov
Companies established in 1835
Water transport in Ukraine
Ukrainian Sea Ports Authority
1835 establishments in Ukraine